Yanick Pires Moreira (born July 31, 1991) is an Angolan professional basketball player for Kolossos Rodou of the Greek Basket League. He played two seasons of college basketball for the SMU Mustangs.

Early life and college career
From 2008 to 2011, Moreira played for Primeiro de Agosto of the Angolan League before moving to the United States to attend South Plains College. After playing two seasons with South Plains, he transferred to Southern Methodist University where he graduated in 2015. Moreira was called for goaltending on a three-point field goal by Bryce Alford, in the closing seconds of the Mustangs' second-round game of the 2015 NCAA Men's Division I Basketball Tournament against UCLA. Moreira took responsibility for the loss, saying "It's all my fault. I should have let the ball hit the rim. I shouldn't have made that mistake as a senior."

Professional career
After going undrafted in the 2015 NBA draft, Moreira joined the Los Angeles Clippers for the 2015 NBA Summer League. In September 2015, he was ruled out for four to six weeks with a minor ligament tear in his left foot. On November 29, 2015, he signed with Rouen Métropole Basket of the French LNB Pro A. In April 2016, he left Rouen and signed with Angolan club Petro de Luanda. He was later loaned to Spanish club UCAM Murcia for the rest of the 2015–16 ACB season.

In July 2016, Moreira joined the Toronto Raptors for the 2016 NBA Summer League. On August 11, 2016, he signed with the Raptors, but was waived on October 22, 2016, after appearing in one preseason game. On October 30, 2016, he was acquired by Raptors 905 of the NBA Development League as an affiliate player of Toronto. On May 3, 2017, he signed with Sanat Naft Abadan of the Iranian Super League.

On July 13, 2017, Moreira signed with Russian club Parma for the 2017–18 season. He averaged 9 points and 6 rebounds per game in the VTB league. On August 5, 2018, Moreira joined the Greek club PAOK. Moreira spent the 2019–20 season with Peristeri and averaged 12.7 points and 6.7 rebounds per game.

He signed with AEK Athens on June 18, 2020. He was voted as the MVP of the month for November in the Basketball Champions League after averaging 17.7 points and 6.3 rebounds per game. Overall, Moreira averaged 13 points, 6.2 rebounds, 1.4 blocks, and 1.2 assists throughout the 2020-21 campaign with AEK.

On July 28, 2021, Moreira officially returned to Peristeri. On January 3, 2022, he parted ways once again with the club. During his second stint, Moreira averaged 7 points and 4.5 rebounds, playing only 15 minutes per game.

On March 14, 2022, Moreira returned to Angola, signing with Petro de Luanda of the Angolan Basketball League. In Petro's BAL Season 2 campaign, he averaged 11.4 points and 5.6 rebounds per game coming off the bench and helped the team reach the 2022 BAL Finals. In the final, Moreira scored 18 points and grabbed 7 rebounds, however, US Monastir was able to hold off Petro and win their first BAL championship.

On September 20, 2022, Moreira signed with Greek club Kolossos Rodou.

National team career
Moreira has been a regular member of the Angola national basketball team since 2010, having competed at the 2014 FIBA Basketball World Cup. At the 2014 FIBA Basketball World Cup, Moreira scored a tournament-high and career-high 38 points, along with 15 rebounds, in an 83–91 win against Australia.

References

External links
 SMU Mustangs bio
 Moreira's FIBA archive profile

1991 births
Living people
2014 FIBA Basketball World Cup players
2019 FIBA Basketball World Cup players
AEK B.C. players
Angolan expatriate basketball people in France
Angolan expatriate basketball people in Greece
Angolan expatriate basketball people in Iran
Angolan expatriate basketball people in Italy
Angolan expatriate basketball people in Russia
Angolan expatriate basketball people in Spain
Angolan expatriate basketball people in the United States
Angolan men's basketball players
CB Murcia players
C.D. Primeiro de Agosto men's basketball players
Centers (basketball)
Angolan expatriate basketball people in Canada
Kolossos Rodou B.C. players
Liga ACB players
P.A.O.K. BC players
Parma Basket players
Peristeri B.C. players
Raptors 905 players
SMU Mustangs men's basketball players
South Plains Texans basketball players
Basketball players from Luanda
Virtus Bologna players
Atlético Petróleos de Luanda basketball players